Infrastructure damage during the Russo-Georgian War became noticeable on 12 August when local authorities claimed that about 70 percent of Tskhinvali's buildings (public and private) had been damaged during the Georgian military operation. According to later Russian statements, about 20 percent of Tskhinvali's buildings had been damaged and 10 percent were "beyond repair". In late August, South Ossetian parliament deputy speaker Tarzan Kokoity claimed that according to a preliminary assessment, Georgian damage in South Ossetia was valued at 100 billion rubles.

Background
According to HRW, during the night of 7–8 August Georgian forces heavily shelled Tskhinvali and several nearby Ossetian villages; the city was also heavily shelled during the daytime on 8 August. HRW reported that South Ossetian fighters took up positions in civilian locations (including schools), turning them into military targets. Several of these locations were then hit by Georgian artillery. Shelling resumed on a smaller scale on 9 August, when Georgian forces targeted Russian troops who had moved into Tskhinvali and other areas of South Ossetia.

Tskhinvali 
The Georgian government reported that Tskhinvali was largely reduced to rubble as a result of Russian air attacks. "When aircraft started bombing our positions in Tskhinvali, this is when most civilian buildings were burned", explained Davit Kezerashvili. Russian journalist Yulia Latynina also blamed Russia for damaging the city, saying that when Georgian forces entered Tskhinvali it was intact. After they were driven out by the Russians, the city was in ruins.

Russia bombings
Russia bombed airfields and other economic infrastructure, including the Black Sea port of Poti. Eight to eleven Russian jets reportedly hit container tanks and a shipbuilding plant in the port. The cement factory and civilian area in Kaspi were also reportedly damaged by Russian air raids. The destruction of the railway bridge disrupted Georgian east-west communications and Armenia's main trade route.

United Nations Institute for Training and Research
The United Nations Institute for Training and Research (UNITAR) released a series of detailed satellite maps of the regions affected by the war, acquired on 19 August from UNOSAT. Damage was assessed primarily from satellite images with a resolution of 50 cm. Since it was an initial assessment, it was not independently validated on the ground. UNOSAT reported that 230 buildings in Tskhinvali (5.5 percent of the total) were destroyed or severely damaged. In the villages north of the city, up to 51.9 percent of buildings were damaged. UNOSAT provided imagery of six Georgian naval vessels partially or completely submerged in Poti; no other damage to physical infrastructure or ship-related oil spills were revealed.

HRW used the satellite images to confirm the widespread burning of ethnic-Georgian villages by Ossetian militia in South Ossetia. Amnesty International noted that the most of the damage in Tskhinvali was sustained on or before 10 August and was likely caused by the intense fighting between the Georgian and Russian militaries around 8 August. However, a number of Georgian villages near Tskhinvali were damaged after the major hostilities ended.

References

Russo-Georgian War